Vätterstads IK is a former Swedish ice hockey club from Jönköping. The club was formed in mid 1967 as a merger of IK Stefa and Vättersnäs IF. The club played its home games in Rosenlundshallen, which later was HV71's arena for a period. The club played in the Swedish second division in the seasons of 1967-1968 and 1968-1969

In 1971 the club was merged with Husqvarna IF's ice hockey section forming the still active HV71.

References

Ice hockey teams in Sweden
Ice hockey clubs established in 1967
Ice hockey clubs disestablished in 1971
Sport in Jönköping
HV71
1967 establishments in Sweden
1971 disestablishments in Sweden
Sport in Huskvarna